Hassan Al-Mamun (born 16 December 1978) is a Bangladeshi retired professional footballer who played as a defender. He was mainly deployed as a full back who could play on both sides of the field. He played international football for more than a decade.

He currently works as an assistant coach for the Bangladesh national football team under Javier Cabrera.

Club career
Mamun started his career with Team BJMC in 1992, when he was in tenth grade. Then he went on to join Fakirerpool Young Men's Club, who were known for developing talented young players during the early 90s, but Mamun established himself as one of the best defenders in the country, during his time at Abahani Limited Dhaka. He won the Dhaka League with Abahani before joining Muktijoddha Sangsad KS in 1996.

Mamun spent most of his career captaining Muktijoddha Sangsad KS, his time at the club lasted for eleven years, during which he won the 2003 National Football Championship and the Federation Cup in both 2001 and 2003, while his greatest achievement was the Dhaka League triumph in 2000.

In 2008, Mamun was under controversy after stating in an interview that according to him the government does not care about football and the club officials should be imprisoned for destroying the country's football. His statements lead to 8 professional league teams from Dhaka sign an agreement to not sign the defender for the upcoming B.League season. However, Mamun soon gave another interview in which he said that the journalists misquoted him. He also said that most players alongside him had not been paid for the last three years.

International career
Mamun made his debut for the Bangladesh national team during their 1995 4-nation Tiger Trophy triumph in Myanmar. This was the country's first ever trophy and Mamun was one of the six new faces integrated into the team by head coach Otto Pfister. The following few year saw Mamun establish a regular position in the national team, winning gold in the 1999 South Asian Games along the way. Mamun was also a part of team which won the 2003 SAFF Gold Cup. He played all six matches during the tournament. Anwar Parvez and Mamun's full-back partnership is seen as one of the main reasons Bangladesh won the trophy, as the team played with two strikers and no wingers during the tournament knockout stage. However during the final against Maldives, with captain Rajani Kanta Barman suspended Mamun played as a centre back while also wearing the captaincy armband.

Coaching career
Mamun started his coaching career as the assistant coach of Chittagong Abahani. He was later appointed as Sheikh Jamal DC's assistant coach in 2021, under Mosharraf Hossain Badal.

On 9 March 2022, Mamun was named Javier Cabrera's assistant coach in the Bangladesh national team.

Honours
Abahani Limited Dhaka
Dhaka Premier Division League: 1995

Muktijoddha Sangsad
 National Football Championship: 2003
 Bangladesh Federation Cup: 2001, 2003
 Dhaka Premier Division League: 2000

Chittagong Abahani
 Independence Cup : 2016

Bangladesh
SAFF Championship: 2003
South Asian Games Gold medal: 1999
4-nation Tiger Trophy: 1995

References

External links
 

Living people
1978 births
Bangladeshi footballers
Bangladesh international footballers
Bangladesh Football Premier League players
Muktijoddha Sangsad KC players
Abahani Limited (Dhaka) players
Team BJMC players
Mohammedan SC (Dhaka) players
Abahani Limited (Chittagong) players
Association football defenders
Bangladesh youth international footballers
Bangladeshi football coaches